Café. Waiting. Love ( is a 2014 Taiwanese romantic comedy film directed by Chiang Chin-lin, adapted from Giddens Ko's novel of the same name. The film marks the first on-screen appearance of Vivian Sung.

Plot
Si-ying (Vivian Sung) is a university freshman who works part-time at a café. There, she met A Bu-si (Megan Lai), a professional coffee maker who can make any type of coffee according to a customer's order, the shop's proprietress (Vivian Chow) who is often quiet and alone, seated at a corner of her café most of the time, as well as Ze-Yu (Marcus Chang).

One day, Senior A-Tuo (Bruce Hung), a senior of Si-ying's who's pretty legendary in the university, came to the café with his friends where he met a lesbian who stole his girlfriend - A bu-si, by coincidence. As the friends kept teasing A-Tuo, Si-ying, full of helping and justice heart, helped A-Tuo out of the difficult situation. The two of them eventually became friends after several encounters. Senior A-Tuo is an optimistic person with a happy-go-lucky personality. Besides working part-time at a roadside stall, he also works for Bao Ge (Lee Luo), who was a movie director and now a mediator for gangs, as a cook at his restaurant. There, he got to know Aunt Jin-dao, Bao's wife, (Pauline Lan), and learned to cook a noodle dish from her. After Bao and his wife fell out due to a petty argument, she started up her own dry-cleaning shop which was where Si-ying first met with Aunt Jin-Dao.

Started out as acquaintances, Si-ying and A-Tuo become good friends with each other after hanging out for some time. A-Tuo started having feelings for Si-ying, but Si-ying only treated him as a friend whom she can confess any thinking in her heart openly, as she likes Ze-Yu. Later, Senior A-Tuo went backpacking overseas. It was during this period that Si-Ying realised that A-Tuo is the one whom she has been waiting for all along...

Cast
 Vivian Sung as Si-ying
 Bruce Hung as Senior A-Tuo
 Megan Lai as A Bu-si 
 Vivian Chow as Proprietress
Katie Chen as young proprietress
 Marcus Chang as Ze-yu
Hong Yan Xiang as young Ze-yu
 Lee Luo as Bao
 Pauline Lan as Aunt Jin-dao
 Yuri Gao as A-zu

Cameo
 Emerson Tsai as Liao Ying-hung
 Lin Mei-hsiu as Café patron
 Michelle Chen as customer

Reception
It has grossed NT$37.1 million in Taipei and HK$9.3 million in Hong Kong.

References

External links

2014 romantic comedy films
Taiwanese romantic comedy films
Films about coffee
Films based on Taiwanese novels